McElhiney is a surname. Notable people with the surname include:

Ashley McElhiney (born 1981), American women's basketball player and coach
Bill McElhiney (1915–2002), American musical arranger and trumpeter
Thomas McElhiney (1919–1998), American diplomat

See also
McElhinney